Statistics of the Scottish Football League in season 1963–64.

Scottish League Division One

Scottish League Division Two

See also
1963–64 in Scottish football

References

 
Scottish Football League seasons